The Hellfire Festival was a heavy metal festival held twice in 2009. The first edition of the festival was held at the O2 Academy in Islington, London in February and the second at the National Exhibition Centre in Birmingham in November. The events were organized by the Transcend Music Group.

Hellfire I 
The first edition of the Hellfire Festival was held from Friday, 20 February to Sunday, 22 February 2009 at the 02 Academy in Islington, London. More than 32 bands appeared at the festival spread over two stages and across the three days. Tickets for the festival were priced at £16.50 (Friday), £20.00 (Saturday), £18.00 (Sunday) or £50 for a three-day pass.

Hellfire II 
The second edition of the Hellfire Festival was to take place from Friday, 6 November to Sunday, 8 November 2009 in Halls 8 and 9 of the National Exhibition Centre, Birmingham, in conjunction with the Music Live exhibition. More than 38 bands were to appear at the festival spread over three stages and across the three days but the Friday was cancelled due to poor ticket sales. This led to a confusing stage allocation, where 4 stages were listed but with only three locations. Tickets were priced at £25 per day or £55 for a three-day pass.

 Mistress of Ceremonies: Katie Parsons (Not in attendance)

 Evile were originally booked to play the main stage on Saturday, but pulled out following the death of their bass player Mike Alexander. They were replaced on the bill by Blaze Bayley.

References

External links 

Official MySpace

Heavy metal festivals in the United Kingdom
Music festivals in the West Midlands (county)
Music festivals in London
2009 establishments in England
Music festivals established in 2009